1971 saw the last three known deaths of cosmonauts of the Soviet space program and the only deaths in space. Their mission was to man humanity's first space station. The experimental bay door failed to separate so the first crew failed to dock and second crew were killed on re-entry. 1971 also saw the launch of the first and only British satellite on top of a British rocket after that success the program was cancelled.



Launches

|colspan="8"|

January 
|-

|colspan="8"|

February 
|-

|colspan="8"|

March 
|-

|colspan="8"|

April 
|-

|colspan="8"|

May 
|-

|colspan="8"|

June 
|-

|colspan="8"|

July 
|-

|colspan="8"|

August 
|-

|colspan="8"|

September 
|-

|colspan="8"|

October 
|-

|colspan="8"|

November 
|-

|colspan="8"|

December 
|-

|}

Launches from the Moon 

|}

Deep space rendezvous in 1971

EVAs

Orbital launch summary

By country

By rocket

By family

By type

By configuration

By launch site

By orbit

References 

 
Spaceflight by year